Deadwood may refer to:

Places

Canada 
 Deadwood, Alberta
 Deadwood, British Columbia
 Deadwood River, a tributary of the Dease River in northern British Columbia

United States 
 Deadwood, California (disambiguation), several communities
 Deadwood, Oregon
 Deadwood, South Dakota
 Deadwood, Texas
 Deadwood Draw, on the National Register of Historic Places in Cheyenne County, Nebraska

Arts, entertainment, and media
 Dead Wood (2007), a British horror film
 Deadwood (game), a board game
 "Deadwood" (Dirty Pretty Things song), 2006
 "Deadwood" (Toni Braxton song), 2017
 "Deadwood", a song by Garbage, a B-side of the single "I Think I'm Paranoid"
 Deadwood (TV series), a 2004–2006 American western drama series on HBO
 "Deadwood" (Deadwood episode), the first episode of the HBO television series
 Deadwood: The Movie (2019), a film continuation of the HBO television series

Other uses
 Deadwood (shipbuilding), a shipbuilding term

See also 
 Dead wood (disambiguation)